Hermione Jane Norris (born 5 December 1966) is an English actress. She attended the London Academy of Music and Dramatic Art in the 1980s, before taking small roles in theatre and on television. In 1996, she was cast in her breakout role of Karen Marsden in the comedy drama television series Cold Feet. She appeared in every episode of the series from 1998 to 2003 and was nominated for a British Comedy Award.

From 2002 to 2005, Norris co-starred in the crime drama series Wire in the Blood as Carol Jordan, and from 2005 to 2009 co-starred in the BBC One spy drama Spooks as Ros Myers. Her role in Spooks won her the award for Best Actress at the 2008 ITV3 Crime Thriller Awards, and another nomination the next year. From 2007 to 2009, she co-starred in the ITV comedy drama Kingdom. In 2020, she appeared in the Australian thriller series Between Two Worlds.

Early life 
Norris was born in Paddington, London, the second of four children. She has two sisters, a brother and two half-sisters. Her parents, businessman Michael and health visitor Helen Norris (née Latham), divorced when she was four years old. She moved with her mother and siblings to live with her grandmother in Derbyshire, but moved back to London a few years later. At age 12, she decided that she wanted to be a ballerina and won a scholarship at the Elmhurst School for Dance. While there, she took up drama at an after-school club, performing alongside her dance studies until she left aged 17.

At age 19, she enrolled at the London Academy of Music and Dramatic Art (LAMDA). On an exchange to the Moscow Art Theatre School, she played Nina in a production of The Seagull.

Career 

Norris made her professional stage debut in a 1989 production of A Midsummer Night's Dream, which earned her her Equity card. She made her television debut in the 1991 BBC serial The Men's Room, playing the daughter of Bill Nighy's character. Other early television roles include appearances in Agatha Christie's Poirot, the television serial Clarissa, and a 1991 episode of Drop the Dead Donkey. She continued to make guest appearances in series such as Between the Lines and Casualty. In 1995 she played Helen in the Royal Exchange, Manchester's production of Look Back in Anger.

After being out of work for four months in 1996, Norris considered quitting acting and reading for a degree in law, intending to become a solicitor. However, she got a part in Cold Feet playing Karen Marsden, a middle-class woman who feels trapped by her middle-class lifestyle. Norris appeared in every episode and was nominated for a British Comedy Award for Best Actress in 2001.

During the six years Cold Feet ran, Norris appeared in a leading role in the BBC drama Berkeley Square, Killing Time: The Millennium Poem, starring opposite Christopher Eccleston, and the 2002 television film Falling Apart, playing a woman in a violent relationship. In 2002, she co-starred with Robson Green in Wire in the Blood, playing Detective Inspector Carol Jordan. She stayed with the series until 2005 when she was replaced by Simone Lahbib. Further film roles include an appearance in an adaptation of Kingsley Amis's Lucky Jim, and in David Kane's Born Romantic.

At the end of 2005 she was cast in the BBC One spy drama Spooks, playing Ros Myers. She appeared throughout the 2006 series, then in eight of the 10 episodes in the 2007 series before taking time off filming for maternity leave. She returned to the show for the 2008 series. For her part, she won the Best Actress award at the inaugural ITV3 Crime Thriller Awards. She was nominated in the same category the next year. She left the series in 2009 after four years.

From 2007 to 2009, she appeared in three series of Kingdom playing Beatrice Kingdom, the half-sister of Stephen Fry's character. She took the role as a change of pace from the "ice maiden" characters she often portrays. In 2010, she starred opposite Trevor Eve in the remake of Bouquet of Barbed Wire. In 2010, she was cast in the television science fiction drama Outcasts as Stella Isen, the head of security on an extraterrestrial human colony. Filming occurred on location in South Africa. From November 2010, Norris played Ruth Condomine in a national tour of Noël Coward's Blithe Spirit. She starred opposite her Cold Feet co-star Robert Bathurst, and Alison Steadman. She also starred in The Crimson Field, a British Production about a field hospital in France in WW1.

On 4 October 2014, Norris guest-starred in episode 7 of the eighth series of the BBC's Doctor Who, 'Kill The Moon'.  She played Lundvik, an astronaut.

Norris also starred as Jo in the Sky1 television film television film adaptation of the M. C. Beaton novel Agatha Raisin and the Quiche of Death.

Norris also starred in series five of Luther on BBC One in January 2019. Later that year, she was announced as the starring cast member of Seven Network's Between Two Worlds, created by Bevan Lee and directed by Kriv Stenders.

Personal life 
In 2002, Norris began a relationship with Simon Wheeler, a writer on Wire in the Blood. The couple married in December 2002 in a ceremony at the Tower of London. They have two children. Norris's father-in-law is General Sir Roger Wheeler, the Chief of the General Staff from 1997 to 2000.

Filmography

Film

Television

Stage

References

External links 

1966 births
Living people
Alumni of the London Academy of Music and Dramatic Art
People from Paddington
English film actresses
English stage actresses
English television actresses
20th-century English actresses
21st-century English actresses
People educated at the Elmhurst School for Dance